Alixandra Creek Chesno (born October 22, 1972) is an American former professional tennis player.

Raised in Rochester, New York, Creek trained at Florida's Nick Bollettieri Tennis Academy and played collegiate tennis for the University of Arizona in the early 1990s. She won two Pac-10 singles championships and was the NCAA Division I doubles champion in 1993, partnering Michelle Oldham.

Creek reached a best singles ranking of 205 on the professional tour and won two titles on the ITF Women's Circuit. She featured in the women's doubles main draw of the 1993 US Open as a wildcard pairing with collegiate partner Michelle Oldham. Her best doubles ranking was 284 in the world.

ITF finals

Singles: 3 (2–1)

Doubles: 2 (1–1)

References

External links
 
 

1972 births
Living people
American female tennis players
Arizona Wildcats women's tennis players
Tennis people from New York (state)
Sportspeople from Rochester, New York